No-load loss (also called "fixed loss") is a portion of the loss of electricity that does not depend on the power being distributed through an electric circuit, as opposed to the load loss. No-load loss typically depends on the operating voltage of a grid unit and can be attributed to:
 dielectric loss in cables;
 core loss in electric transformers;
 some types of losses in synchronous condensers (rotor surface losses, pulsating losses in stator teeth, and losses in the stator due to higher harmonics of the rotor field);
 loss in the electromechanical measuring devices (low, e. g. an "analog" electrical meter consumes less than 1.5 Watts of power);
 corona loss in high-volage lines.

See also 
 No load power

References

Sources 
 

Electric power distribution